Lincoln City is a city in Lincoln County on the Oregon Coast of the United States, between Tillamook and Newport. It is named after the county, which was named in honor of former U.S. President Abraham Lincoln. The population was 9,815 at the 2020 Census.

History 

Lincoln City was incorporated on March 3, 1965, uniting the cities of Delake, Oceanlake and Taft, and the unincorporated communities of Cutler City and Nelscott. These were adjacent communities along U.S. Route 101, which serves as Lincoln City's main street. The name "Lincoln City" was chosen from contest entries submitted by local school children. The contest was held when it was determined that using one of the five communities' names would be too controversial.

Former communities

Cutler City
Cutler City is located on the east shore of Siletz Bay. The community was started by Mr. and Mrs. George Cutler. It is claimed they received the property from Chief Charles "Charley" DePoe of the Siletz tribe (part of the present-day Confederated Tribes of the Siletz). Cutler City post office ran from 1930 until the formation of Lincoln City.

Delake
Delake is near Devils Lake, and was named for the way the local Finnish people pronounced the name of the lake. Delake post office was established in 1924, and reestablished as Oceanlake (see below) in 1927.

Nelscott
Nelscott was named by combining the surnames of Charles P. Nelson and Dr. W.G. Scott, who founded the community in 1926. Nelscott post office ran from 1929 until incorporation as Lincoln City. Nelscott Reef is known for its surf and was in Surfer Magazine in 2003 as one of the Pacific Ocean's best places to surf.

Oceanlake
Oceanlake was named for its position between Devils Lake and the Pacific Ocean. Its post office ran from 1927 until incorporation as Lincoln City. In 1945, Oceanlake annexed Wecoma Beach and incorporated as a city. The neighborhood is home to Oceanlake Elementary School.

Taft
Taft was named for the 27th U.S. president William Howard Taft. Taft post office was established in 1906, and was named when Taft was Secretary of War. The post office ran until incorporation as Lincoln City.

Wecoma Beach
Oceanlake annexed Wecoma Beach, a community to the north, and was incorporated on November 3, 1945.  Wecoma is a Chinook jargon word meaning "sea". The post office at this locale was originally named Wecoma. It was changed to Wecoma Beach in 1949. The office is no longer in operation.

Roads End

On July 1, 2013, Lincoln City forcibly annexed the Roads End community to its north, by informing homeowners they would not receive water service, unless the owner consented to the annexation. The annexation also created a special zoning area for Roads End.

Government
The city operates under a city charter, with a paid city manager, acting as chief executive, and a non-paid mayor who is elected for a four-year term, and six-member city council.  The city council is elected from three wards and serves four-year terms.

Economy
Lincoln City has three primary economic resources: tourism, healthcare, and retirement.

In 1995 the Confederated Tribes of Siletz opened Chinook Winds Casino at the northern end of the city on property overlooking the Pacific Ocean. 
 
Major employers include Chinook Winds Casino, city government, Lincoln County School District, and Samaritan North Lincoln Hospital.

Geography

Lincoln City is home to one of the world's shortest rivers, the D River, connecting Devil's Lake with the Pacific Ocean.

Climate
The driest month on average is July, with December the wettest. The average July afternoon humidity is 75%, and the average January afternoon humidity is 84%.

Demographics

As of the census of 2010, there were 7,930 people, 3,645 households, and 1,959 families residing in the city. The racial makeup of the city was 83.7% White, 0.4% African American, 3.5% Native American, 1.5% Asian, 0.1% Pacific Islander, 7.1% from other races, and 3.6% from two or more races. Hispanic or Latino of any race were 13.2% of the population.

There were 3,645 households, of which about 22% had children under the age of 18 living with them, about 37% were married couples living together, 12% had a female householder with no husband present, about 5% had a male householder with no wife present, and about 46% were non-families. About 37% of all households were made up of individuals, and about 16% had someone living alone who was 65 years of age or older. The average household size was 2.14 and the average family size was 2.74.

The median age in the city was about 46 years. About 18% of residents were under the age of 18; about 8% were between the ages of 18 and 24; about 23% were from 25 to 44; about 31% were from 45 to 64; and about 20% were 65 years of age or older. The gender makeup of the city was about 47% male and 53% female.

Healthcare
The Samaritan North Lincoln Hospital is the only hospital in Lincoln City and has associated outpatient medical and specialty clinics. It is a 25-bed critical access hospital with a level IV trauma designation. It is part of the five hospital Samaritan Health Services healthcare system headquartered in Corvallis, Oregon. In 2020, a new hospital was constructed just east of the old hospital.

Arts and culture
The Lincoln City Cultural Center, housed in the historic DeLake School building, offers a wide variety of classes and events year-round.

Two kite festivals are held annually in Lincoln City, the Summer Kite Festival in June and the Fall Kite Festival in October. Both festivals are each held at D River Wayside, where several other world-class kite events are held. The city is known by some as the "Kite Capital of the World". Lincoln City also boasts year round glass float drops across its seven miles of beach thanks to the Finders Keepers program.

Education
Public schools in Lincoln City are served by the Lincoln County School District.

Media
Lincoln City is served by a weekly newspaper, the Lincoln City News Guard, a semi-weekly newspaper, the News-Times, and a daily news source, the Lincoln City Homepage.

KBCH AM 1400 is in Lincoln City and provides Lincoln County news coverage as well as coverage of local sports.

Notable people

Ruth Dennis Grover
M. K. Wren

References

External links

City of Lincoln City (official website)

 
1965 establishments in Oregon
Cities in Lincoln County, Oregon
Cities in Oregon
Oregon Coast
Populated coastal places in Oregon